The Dean of Elphin and Ardagh is based in St John the Baptist Cathedral, Sligo in the Diocese of Elphin and Ardagh within the united bishopric of Kilmore, Elphin and Ardagh of the Church of Ireland. The dioceses of Elphin and Ardagh were merged in 1841. The original cathedral of Ardagh, Co Longford had been destroyed by military action in 1496 and the original diocesan cathedral of Saint Mary’s, Elphin, Co Roscommon was damaged by a storm in 1957 and abandoned in 1961.

The current incumbent is The Very Reverend A Williams.

Deans of Elphin
?–1587 Malachi O'Flanagan 
1587 Thomas O'Heidegein 
1591–1603 Thomas Burke  
1603 Edward King (?later Bishop of Elphin 1611) 
1606 Eriell O'Higgin 
1613/–1633 John Evatt 
1634 Richard Jones 
1642–1648 Joseph Ware 
?–1661 Edward Synge (afterwards Bishop of Limerick, Ardfert and Aghadoe, 1661) 
1661–1664 Clement Paman (Poet)
1664 Daniel Neyland 
1665 Thomas Crofton 
1683–1700 Anthony Cope (afterwards Dean of Connor, 1700) 
1700–1723 Edward Goldsmith 
1723–1739 Peter Mahon 
1739–1757 Christopher Lloyd 
1757–1768 James Dickson (afterwards Dean of Down) 
1768–1778 Robert Bligh 
1778–1794 John Barry 
1794–1797 Francis Browne
1797–1848 John French 
1848–1894 William Warburton 
1894–1900 Francis Burke
1904–1912 Alexander Major Kearney

Deans of Ardagh
1552 John Bowerman 
1563 William Brady 
1595 Robert Richardson 
1606–1625 Lewis Jones (also Dean of Cashel, 1607)  (but possibly the son of Archbishop Jones)
1625–1637 Henry Jones (son of above) (afterwards Dean of Kilmore 1637) 
1637–? Nicholas Bernard (fled to England 1641-later chaplain to Oliver Cromwell) 
1661–1701 John Kerb or Carr 
1701 John Barton
1718–1720 Charles Cobbe (afterwards Bishop of Killala and Achonry 1720) 
1720–1721 Josiah Hort (afterwards Bishop of Ferns 1721) 
1721 Robert Howard (later Bishop of Killala and Achonry 1726) 
1727–?1749  Lewis Saurin (died 1749)
1749–1757 George Sandford
1757–1769 Thomas White
1769–1785 William French
1785–1790 Lilly Butler
1790–1800 Charles Mongan (Warburton) (afterwards Dean of Clonmacnoise, later Bishop of Limerick, Ardfert and Aghadoe 1806) 
1800-1813 Hon Richard Bourke (afterwards Bishop of Waterford and Lismore 1813) 
1814–1829 Richard Graves
1829–1854 Richard Murray
1854–1860 Hugh Usher Tighe (afterwards Dean of Derry, 1860)
1860–1880 Augustus William West
1880–1896 Alexander Orme
1896-1912 Frederic Potterton (died 1912)
1913–1921 Thomas Reilly

Deans of Elphin and Ardagh
1933-1944 John Ardill
1944-1954 John Beresford
1954-1963 James Wilson
1963-1967 George Bolton
1967-1983 Cecil Wyndham Browne
1983–1991 Hugh Mortimer
1992–1999 Stuart McGee
1999–2004 David Griscome
2004– now Arfon Williams

References

 
 
 
 Dean
Elphin and Ardagh